Natasha Walter (born 20 January 1967) is a British feminist writer and human rights activist. She is the author of a novel, A Quiet Life (2016), three works of non-fiction: Before the Light Fades: a memoir of grief and resistance (2023, Virago), Living Dolls: The Return of Sexism (2010, Virago), and The New Feminism (1998, Virago). She is also the founder of the charity Women for Refugee Women.

Background and career
Her father was Nicolas Walter, an anarchist and secular humanist writer, while her mother Ruth Walter (née Oppenheim) was a teacher and (later) social worker. Her grandfather was William Grey Walter, a neuroscientist. Her grandparents on her mother's side were refugees from Nazi Germany.

Walter read English at St John's College, Cambridge, graduating with a double First, and then won a Frank Knox Fellowship to Harvard. Her first job was at Vogue magazine, and she subsequently became Deputy Literary Editor of The Independent and then a columnist and feature writer for The Guardian. She went on to write for many publications, and to appear regularly on BBC2's Newsnight Review and Radio 4's Front Row. In 1999 she was a judge on the Booker Prize and in 2013 she was a judge on the Women's Prize for Fiction (formerly the Orange Prize).

Walter was the founder in 2006 of the charity Women for Refugee Women, where she was the director until 2021. The charity supports women who seek asylum to tell their stories and challenges the injustices they experience.  

In 2008 Women for Refugee Women produced the play Motherland which Natasha Walter wrote based on the experiences of women and children in immigration detention. It was directed by Juliet Stevenson and performed at the Young Vic in 2008 by Juliet Stevenson, Harriet Walter and others. Women for Refugee Women subsequently worked in partnership with other organisations to campaign for the end to the detention of children for immigration purposes in the UK, a policy which the government announced it would end in 2010.

Women for Refugee Women publishes research on the experiences of women in the asylum process, campaigns for an end to the detention of refugee women, and supports refugee women throughout the UK.

Walter is the author of The New Feminism, published by Virago in 1998. Her book Living Dolls, also published by Virago, looks at the resurgence of sexism in contemporary culture.

In March 2015, Natasha Walter was the Humanitas Visiting Professor of Women's Rights at Cambridge University.

Walter is also the author of a novel, A Quiet Life, which is based loosely on the life of Melinda Marling, the wife of Cambridge spy Donald Maclean.

Walter's memoir, Before the Light Fades: a memoir of grief and resistance, will be published by Virago in 2023. It tells the story of her mother's death by suicide, and the legacy of the political activism of her mother in the 1960s and that of her grandfather in the 1930s.

In October 2019, Walter was arrested for blocking a road in Extinction Rebellion's 'October Rebellion' in London's Trafalgar Square. She tweeted: "I was one of 100s arrested yesterday for drawing attention to the destruction of our beautiful planet." She has continued to be active with Extinction Rebellion and Writers Rebel, a group of writers involved with the climate movement.

Walter lives in London with her partner and their two children.

Works
The New Feminism (1998). 
On the Move: feminism for a new generation (1999). 
Living Dolls (2009). 
A Quiet Life (2016)

Recognition
She was recognized as one of the BBC's 100 women of 2013.

References

External links

Women for Refugee Women
2002/01/interview_with_natasha_walter An interview with Walter on the website The F-Word
 A feature by Walter in The Guardian on the situation facing Saudi women
AuthKey=6ba2fcf21ac8a0b0e4ddf01c86ed4e90&issue=503 A feature from Prospect magazine on biology and the backlash

1967 births
Alumni of St John's College, Cambridge
British feminist writers
Harvard University alumni
People educated at North London Collegiate School
Living people
British feminists
BBC 100 Women
21st-century British novelists
21st-century British women writers